The 2014–15 American Eagles men's basketball team represented American University during the 2014–15 NCAA Division I men's basketball season. The Eagles, led by second year head coach Mike Brennan, played their home games at Bender Arena and were members of the Patriot League. They finished the season 17–16, 8–10 in Patriot League play to finish in a three way tie for sixth place. They advanced to the championship game of the Patriot League tournament where they lost to Lafayette.

Roster

Schedule

|-
!colspan=9 style="background:#0000FF; color:#CC0000;"| Non-conference regular season

|-
!colspan=9 style="background:#0000FF; color:#CC0000;"| Conference regular season

|-
!colspan=9 style="background:#0000FF; color:#CC0000;"| Patriot League tournament

See also
2014–15 American Eagles women's basketball team

References

American Eagles men's basketball seasons
American
American Eagles men's basketball
American Eagles men's basketball